Maja Martyna Włoszczowska (born 9 November 1983 in Warsaw) is a Polish mountain biker. She is the 2008 and 2016 Olympic silver medalist in cross-country cycling. She is a member of the International Olympic Committee (IOC).

Career
Włoszczowska won the silver medal in mountain biking at the 2008 Summer Olympics in Beijing, China. Since 2009, she has lent her name to a cross-country race in her home town of Jelenia Góra, called "Jelenia Góra Trophy Maja Włoszczowska MTB Race". Riders such as Miguel Martinez, Catharine Pendrel or Mary McConneloug have taken part in it.

Włoszczowska became the world champion in elite cross-country mountain biking in 2010. At the 2011 World Championships, she was well-positioned to retain her title, but lost over a minute due to a flat tire and finished in second place, 28 seconds behind Catharine Pendrel.

In June 2015, she won the bronze medal in cross-country mountain biking at the inaugural European Games.

In August 2016, Włoszczowska won the silver medal in mountain biking at the Summer Olympics in Rio de Janeiro, Brazil.
She was on the start list of 2018 Cross Country European Championships and finished 4.

Awards
For her sport achievements, she received: 
 Golden Cross of Merit in 2008.

Major achievements

2003
1st in UCI Mountain Bike Marathon World Championships, Lugano, Switzerland.
2004
2nd in UCI Mountain Bike World Championships, Les Gets, France.
2005
2nd in UCI Mountain Bike World Championships, Livigno, ITALIA.
2nd in UCI Mountain Bike European Championships, Kluisbergen, Belgium.
2006
7th in World Cup MTB XCO#1, Curaçao.
4th in World Cup MTB XCO#2, Madrid, Spain.
13th in World Cup MTM XCO#3, Spa Francorchamps, Belgium.
12th in World Cup MTM XCO#4, Fort William, Great Britain.
6th in UCI Mountain Bike European Championships, Chies d'Alpago, ITALIA.
4th in UCI Mountain Bike World Championships, Rotorua, New Zealand.
8th in World Cup MTB XCO#6, Schladming, Austria.
2007
13th in World Cup MTB XCO#1, Houffalize, Belgium.
8th in World Cup MTB XCO#2, Offenburg, Germany.
7th in UCI Mountain Bike European Championships, Cappadocia , Turkey.
4th in UCI Mountain Bike Marathon European Championships, Sankt Wendel, Germany.
2008
12th in World Cup MTB XCO#2, Offenburg, Germany.
18th in UCI Mountain Bike European Championships, Sankt Wendel, Germany.
5th in UCI Mountain Bike World Championships, Val di Sole, ITALIA.
1st in Polish MTB National Championships.
2nd in Women's cross-country at the 2008 Summer Olympics in Beijing, China.
1st in World Cup MTB XCO#9, Schladming, Austria.
2009
1st in European XC Continental Championships, Zoetermeer, Netherlands.
2010
1st in World Cup MTB XCO#5, Val di Sol, Italy.
Elite Women's XC World Championships 2010 – Mont-Sainte-Anne.
2011
2nd in Elite Women's XC World Championships – Champéry, Switzerland.
2012
1st in World Cup MTB XCO#1, Pietermaritzburg, South Africa.
3rd in World Cup MTB XCO#2, Houffalize, Belgium.
2013
2nd in World Cup MTB XCO#1, Albstadt, Germany.
2nd in World Cup MTB XCO#2, Nove Město na Moravě, Czech Republic.
3rd in European Championships, Bern, Switzerland

References

External links
 
 
 
 
 
 
 

1983 births
Living people
Polish female cyclists
Cyclists at the 2004 Summer Olympics
Cyclists at the 2008 Summer Olympics
Cyclists at the 2016 Summer Olympics
Cross-country mountain bikers
Olympic cyclists of Poland
Olympic silver medalists for Poland
Cyclists from Warsaw
Olympic medalists in cycling
Medalists at the 2008 Summer Olympics
Medalists at the 2016 Summer Olympics
UCI Mountain Bike World Champions (women)
European Games bronze medalists for Poland
European Games medalists in cycling
Cyclists at the 2015 European Games
Cyclists at the 2020 Summer Olympics
International Olympic Committee members
21st-century Polish women